Hemitaeniochromis urotaenia is a species of fish endemic to Lake Malawi in East Africa. It is the type species of the genus Hemitaeniochromis, and is part of family Cichlidae in subfamily Pseudocrenilabrinae and the tribe Haplochromini.

See also
Cichlid

References 

 Eccles, D.H. & Trewavas, E. (1989). Malaŵian cichlid fishes. The classification of some Haplochromine genera. Lake Fish Movies, Herten, Germany, 335 pp.
 Oliver, M.K. (2012). Hemitaeniochromis brachyrhynchus, a new species of cichlid fish from Lake Malaŵi, with comments on some other supposed members of the genus (Teleostei: Cichlidae). Zootaxa, 3410: 35–50. PDF
 Regan, C.T. (1922). The cichlid fishes of Lake Nyassa. Proceedings of the Zoological Society of London, 1921: 675-727 & Plates I-VI.

urotaenia
Fish of Africa
Monotypic fish genera
Fish described in 1922